Daniel Garrison, a Representative from New Jersey; born in Pennsville Township, New Jersey near Salem, New Jersey, on April 3, 1782.

Early life and career
He pursued an academic course and engaged in agricultural pursuits. He was a member of the New Jersey General Assembly from 1806 to 1808, and was surrogate of Salem County, New Jersey from 1809 to 1823.

Congress
Garrison was elected as a Jacksonian Democratic-Republican to the Eighteenth Congress and reelected as a Jacksonian to the Nineteenth Congress, serving in office from March 4, 1823 – March 3, 1827. He was not a candidate for renomination in 1826.

Later career
After leaving Congress, Garrison was appointed by President Andrew Jackson as inspector of the revenue and collector of the customs at the port of Bridgeton, New Jersey, in 1834 and served until 1838.

He died in Salem on February 13, 1851, and was interred there in St. John's Episcopal Cemetery.

References

Information found on public domain website of the Bioguide of US Congress.

1782 births
1851 deaths
People from Pennsville Township, New Jersey
Politicians from Cumberland County, New Jersey
Members of the New Jersey General Assembly
Burials at St. John's Episcopal Cemetery, Salem, New Jersey
Democratic-Republican Party members of the United States House of Representatives from New Jersey
Jacksonian members of the United States House of Representatives from New Jersey
19th-century American politicians